Omar Al-Owdah (born 29 December 1998) is a Saudi Arabian football player who plays as a defender for Al-Khaleej.

Career
Al-Owdah signed with Al-Najma in 2010 after having failed trials with Al-Taawoun and Al-Arabi. He started his career playing as a forward before being moved to play as a defender under the advice of his former youth coach Ahmed Abdulmaqsoud. On 17 July 2015, he left Al-Najma after 5 years and joined Al-Hilal. On 23 August 2018, Al-Owdah joined Al-Fayha on loan until the end of the 2018–19 season. He made 13 appearances throughout all competitions and scored 1 goal in the King Cup. On 13 July 2019, Al-Owdah left Al-Hilal and joined Al-Raed. Just one month after signing for Al-Raed, his contract was terminated due to his failure to meet the requirements for professional players. On 21 August 2019, Al-Owdah dropped down a division and joined Al-Batin. On 27 July 2022, Al-Owdah joined Al-Khaleej on a one-year deal.

Honours
Al-Batin
MS League: 2019–20

References

External links 
 

1998 births
Living people
People from Unaizah
Association football defenders
Saudi Arabian footballers
Saudi Arabia youth international footballers
Saudi Professional League players
Saudi First Division League players
Al-Najma SC players
Al Hilal SFC players
Al-Fayha FC players
Al-Raed FC players
Al Batin FC players
Khaleej FC players